Live in Germania is the first live album by Swedish black metal band Marduk. It was recorded at four venues in Germany during the Heaven Shall Burn 1996 tour, engineered and edited at The Abyss, and released on July 7, 1997 by Osmose Productions. The album was originally announced by the band as titled The Black Years, but this was later opted out. Live in Germania is the only Marduk album to feature Peter Tägtgren of Hypocrisy, and also the band's mixer, on guitar.

Track listing

Trivia
 Germania was the Latin exonym for a geographical area of land on the east bank of the Rhine (inner Germania), which included regions of Sarmatia as well as an area under Roman control on the west bank of the Rhine. 
 Germania also was the name Adolf Hitler gave to the projected renewal of the German capital Berlin.

Personnel
 Legion – vocals
 Morgan Steinmeyer Håkansson – guitar
 Peter Tägtgren – guitar, engineering, editing
 B. War – bass
 Fredrik Andersson – drums

References

1997 live albums
Marduk (band) live albums